Hillsvale is a small community in the Canadian province of Nova Scotia, located in  The Municipality of the District of East Hants in Hants County.

Hillsvale is located on the border between East Hants & West Hants.

Hillsvale was once the home of the McClare Brothers Lumber Mill (McClare Bros. Ltd). As of November 2021, you can still see what remains of the buildings and the huge sawdust piles behind them.

References
Hillsvale on Destination Nova Scotia

Communities in Hants County, Nova Scotia
General Service Areas in Nova Scotia